Yu Bing (234 - 280), courtesy name Shiwen, was an official of the Western Jin dynasty of China. He previously served in the state of Eastern Wu during the Three Kingdoms period.

Life
Yu Bing was the eighth son of Yu Fan, an official who served under Sun Quan, the founding emperor of Eastern Wu, and under Sun Quan's predecessor, Sun Ce. His ancestral home was in Yuyao County (餘姚縣), Kuaiji Commandery, which is in present-day Yuyao, Zhejiang. He held extraordinary ambitions when he was young. When he grew up, he served in Wu as a Gentleman of the Yellow Gate (黃門郎) and was promoted to a Master of Writing and Palace Attendant (尚書侍中) later.

In 280, when forces of the Jin dynasty invaded Wu, the Wu imperial court granted authority to Yu Bing to supervise military affairs in Wuchang (武昌; present-day Ezhou, Hubei). However, Yu Bing returned his official seal and authority to the Wu court and then surrendered to Jin. He was appointed as the Administrator (太守) of Jiyin Commandery (濟陰郡; around present-day Dingtao County, Shandong) by the Jin government. He became famous for upholding justice and helping the poor while he held office.

Family
Yu Bing had 10 brothers. Among them, the notable ones were his fourth brother Yu Si, fifth brother Yu Zhong, and sixth brother Yu Song.

See also
 Lists of people of the Three Kingdoms

References

 Chen, Shou (3rd century). Records of the Three Kingdoms (Sanguozhi).
 Pei, Songzhi (5th century). Annotations to Records of the Three Kingdoms (Sanguozhi zhu).

Year of birth unknown
Year of death unknown
Eastern Wu politicians
Jin dynasty (266–420) politicians
Politicians from Ningbo